Rumpole a La Carte is a 1990 collection of short stories by John Mortimer about defence barrister Horace Rumpole. They were adapted from his scripts for the TV series of the same name.
The stories were:
"Rumpole à la Carte" 
"Rumpole and the Quacks"
"Rumpole and the Right to Silence" 
"Rumpole and the Summer of Discontent"
"Rumpole at Sea" 
"Rumpole for the Prosecution"

References

Works by John Mortimer
1990 short story collections